Chromatia is a genus of darkling beetles in the family Tenebrionidae. There is one described species in Chromatia, C. amoena.

References

Further reading

 

Tenebrionoidea